Automatic Dependent Surveillance–Broadcast (ADS-B) is a surveillance technology and form of Electronic Conspicuity in which an aircraft determines its position via satellite navigation or other sensors and periodically broadcasts it, enabling it to be tracked. The information can be received by air traffic control ground stations as a replacement for secondary surveillance radar, as no interrogation signal is needed from the ground. It can also be transmitted and received point-to-point by other aircraft to provide situational awareness and allow self-separation.
ADS-B is "automatic" in that it requires no pilot or external input. It is "dependent" in that it depends on data from the aircraft's navigation system.

ADS-B is being incorporated in various jurisdictions worldwide. It is an element of the United States Next Generation Air Transportation System (NextGen), the Airports Authority of India upgrade plans in line with the ICAO Global Plan Initiatives and Aviation System Block Upgrade (ASBU), and the Single European Sky ATM Research project (SESAR). ADS-B equipment is mandatory for instrument flight rules (IFR) category aircraft in Australian airspace; the United States has required many aircraft (including all commercial passenger carriers and aircraft flying in areas that required a transponder) to be so equipped since January 2020; and, the equipment has been mandatory for some aircraft in Europe since 2017. Canada uses ADS-B for surveillance in remote regions not covered by traditional radar (areas around Hudson Bay, the Labrador Sea, Davis Strait, Baffin Bay and southern Greenland) since January 15, 2009. Aircraft operators are encouraged to install ADS-B products that are interoperable with US and European standards, and Canadian air traffic controllers can provide better and more fuel efficient flight routes when operators can be tracked via ADS-B.

Description 
ADS-B, which consists of two different services, "ADS-B Out" and "ADS-B In", could replace radar as the primary surveillance method for controlling aircraft worldwide. In the United States, ADS-B is an integral component of the NextGen national airspace strategy for upgrading and enhancing aviation infrastructure and operations. Also within the United States, the ADS-B system can provide traffic- and government-generated graphical weather information at no cost through TIS-B and FIS-B applications. ADS-B enhances safety by making an aircraft visible, realtime, to air traffic control (ATC) and to other appropriately equipped ADS-B aircraft with position and velocity data transmitted every second. ADS-B data can be recorded and downloaded for post-flight analysis. ADS-B also provides the data infrastructure for inexpensive flight tracking, planning, and dispatch.

Using "ADS-B Out", each aircraft periodically broadcasts information about itself, such as identification, current position, altitude and velocity, through an onboard transmitter. ADS-B Out provides air traffic controllers with real-time position information that is, in most cases, more accurate than the information available with current radar-based systems. With more accurate information, ATC will be able to position and separate aircraft with improved precision and timing.

"ADS-B In" is the reception by aircraft of FIS-B and TIS-B data and other ADS-B data such as direct communication from nearby aircraft. The ground station broadcast data is typically only made available in the presence of an ADS-B Out broadcasting aircraft, limiting the usefulness of purely ADS-B In devices.

The system relies on two avionics components aboard each aircraft: a high-integrity satellite navigation source (i.e. GPS or other certified GNSS receiver) and a datalink (the ADS-B unit). There are several types of certified ADS-B data links, but the most common ones operate at 1090 MHz, essentially a modified Mode S transponder, or at 978 MHz. The FAA would like to see aircraft that operate exclusively below  use the 978 MHz link, as this will alleviate congestion of the 1090 MHz frequency. To obtain ADS-B Out capability at 1090 MHz, user-operators can install a new transponder or modify an existing transponder if the manufacturer offers an ADS-B upgrade (plus install a certified GNSS position source if one is not already present).

Benefits
ADS-B provides many benefits to both pilots and air traffic control that improve both the safety and efficiency of flight.

When using an ADS-B In system, a pilot is able to view traffic information about surrounding aircraft if those aircraft are equipped with ADS-B Out. This information includes altitude, heading, speed, and distance to aircraft. In addition to receiving position reports from ADS-B Out participants, in the US, TIS-B can provide position reports on non ADS-B Out-equipped aircraft if suitable ground equipment and ground radar exist. ADS-R re-transmits ADS-B position reports between UAT and 1090 MHz frequency bands.

Aircraft equipped with universal access transceiver (UAT) ADS-B In technology will be able to receive weather reports, and in the US, weather radar through flight information service-broadcast (FIS-B), which also transmits readable flight information such as temporary flight restrictions (TFRs) and NOTAMs.

ADS-B ground stations are significantly cheaper to install and operate compared to primary and secondary radar systems used by air traffic control for aircraft separation and control.

Unlike some alternative in-flight weather services currently being offered commercially, there will be no subscription fees to use ADS-B services or its various benefits in the US. The aircraft owner will pay for the equipment and installation, while the Federal Aviation Administration (FAA) will pay for administering and broadcasting all the services related to the technology.

Safety
Situational awareness
ADS-B makes flying significantly safer for the aviation community by providing pilots with improved situational awareness. Pilots in an ADS-B In equipped cockpit will have the ability to see, on their in-cockpit flight display, other traffic operating in the airspace as well as access to clear and detailed weather information. They will also be able to receive pertinent updates ranging from temporary flight restrictions to runway closings.

Improved visibility
Even aircraft only equipped with ADS-B Out will benefit from air traffic controllers' ability to more accurately and reliably monitor their position. When using this system both pilots and controllers will see the same radar picture. Other fully equipped aircraft using the airspace around them will be able to more easily identify and avoid conflict with an aircraft equipped with ADS-B Out. With past systems such as the Traffic alert and Collision Avoidance System (TCAS) aircraft could only see other aircraft equipped with the same technology. With ADS-B, information is sent to aircraft using ADS-B In, which displays all aircraft in the area, provided those aircraft are equipped with ADS-B Out. ADS-B provides better surveillance in fringe areas of radar coverage. ADS-B does not have the siting limitations of radar. Its accuracy is consistent throughout the range. In both forms of ADS-B (1090ES & 978 MHz UAT), the position report is updated once per second. The 978 MHz UAT provides the information in a single, short duration transmission. The 1090ES system transmits two different kinds of position reports (even/odd) randomly. To decode the position unambiguously, one position report of both kinds or a reference position nearby is needed.

ADS-B enables improved safety by providing:
 Radar-like IFR separation in non-radar airspace
 Increased VFR flight following coverage
 ATC final approach and runway occupancy, reducing runway incursions on the ground
 More accurate search and rescue response — although ADS-B can transmit "aircraft down" data, the FAA has stated that there is no intention to perform even a study of ADS-B's effectiveness in an "aircraft down" situation, simply based on the fact that ADS-B equipment has no requirement to be crashworthy, as compared to the current "black box" recorder. ADS-B was demonstrated to the Civil Air Patrol (CAP) in March 2003 by AOPA via flight demonstrations for possible integration of the technology in CAP activities.
 Helps pilots to see and avoid other aircraft
 Cockpit final approach and runway occupancy
 Visual separation in VFR and MVFR conditions
 VFR-like separation in all weather conditions
 Real-time cockpit weather display
 Real-time cockpit airspace display

Efficiency
Reduced environmental impact
ADS-B technology provides a more accurate report of an aircraft's position. This allows controllers to guide aircraft into and out of crowded airspace with smaller separation standards than it was previously possible to do safely. This reduces the amount of time aircraft must spend waiting for clearances, being vectored for spacing and holding. Estimates show that this is already having a beneficial impact by reducing pollution and fuel consumption.

Traffic capacity improvement
ADS-B enables increased capacity and efficiency by supporting:
 Better ATC traffic flow management
 Merging and spacing
 Self-separation or station keeping
 Enhanced visual approaches;
 Closely spaced parallel approaches;
 Reduced spacing on final approach;
 Reduced aircraft separations;
 Enhanced operations in high altitude airspace for the incremental evolution of the "free flight" concept;
 Surface operations in lower visibility conditions;
 Near visual meteorological conditions (VMC) capacities throughout the airspace in most weather conditions;
 Improved air traffic control services in non-radar airspace;
 Trajectory-based operations providing a gently ascending and descending gradient with no step-downs or holding patterns needed. This will produce optimal trajectories with each aircraft becoming one node within a system wide information management network connecting all equipped parties in the air and on the ground. With all parties equipped with NextGen equipage, benefits will include reduced gate-to-gate travel times, increased runway utilization capacity, and increased efficiency with carbon conservation.
 Use of ADS-B and CDTI may allow decreased approach spacing at certain airports to improve capacity during reduced-visibility operations when visual approach operations would normally be terminated (e.g., ceilings less than MVA +500).

Other applications
The ADS-B data link supports a number of airborne and ground applications. Each application has its own operational concepts, algorithms, procedures, standards, and user training.

Cockpit display of traffic information
A cockpit display of traffic information (CDTI) is a generic display that provides the flight crew with surveillance information about other aircraft, including their position. Traffic information for a CDTI may be obtained from one or multiple sources, including ADS-B, TCAS, and TIS-B. Direct air-to-air transmission of ADS-B messages supports display of proximate aircraft on a CDTI.

In addition to traffic based on ADS-B reports, a CDTI function might also display current weather conditions, terrain, airspace structure, obstructions, detailed airport maps, and other information relevant to the particular phase of flight.

Airborne collision avoidance
ADS-B is seen as a valuable technology to enhance airborne collision avoidance system (ACAS) operation. Incorporation of ADS-B can provide benefits such as:
 Decreasing the number of active interrogations required by ACAS, thus increasing effective range in high-density airspace.
 Reducing unnecessary alarm rate by incorporating the ADS-B state vector, aircraft intent, and other information.
 Use of the ACAS display as a CDTI, providing positive identification of traffic.
 Extending collision avoidance below 1,000 feet above ground level, and detecting runway incursions.

Eventually, the ACAS function may be provided based solely on ADS-B, without requiring active interrogations of other aircraft transponders.

Other applications that may benefit from ADS-B include:
 Lighting control automation and operation
 Airport ground vehicle and aircraft rescue and firefighting vehicle operational needs
 Altitude height keeping performance measurements
 General aviation operations control
 Conflict management
 ATS conformance monitoring
 Aircraft spotting where personal receivers can be used to produce a virtual radar picture
 A number of websites use crowd-sourced distributed networks of ADS-B receivers to track air traffic.

Security risk
Aircraft with transponder only, or no transponder capability at all will not be shown. Pilots who become complacent or overconfident in this system are thus a safety problem, not only for themselves but for other transponder-only aircraft, and glider aircraft without ADS-B transponder.

Glider aircraft often use the FLARM system for collision avoidance with other glider aircraft, but this system is not compatible with ADS-B. Aircraft with ADS-B but without FLARM are thus a safety risk for gliders with FLARM but without ADS-B and vice versa. Some aircraft, like those used for towing gliders, have both FLARM and ADS-B transponders for this reason.

A security researcher claimed in 2012 that ADS-B has no defence against being interfered with via spoofed ADS-B messages because they were neither encrypted nor authenticated. The FAA responded to this criticism saying that they were aware of the issues and risks but were unable to disclose how they are mitigated as that is classified. A possible mitigation is multilateration to verify that the claimed position is close to the position from which the message was broadcast. Here the timing of received messages is compared to establish distances from the antenna to the plane.

The lack of any authentication within the standard makes it mandatory to validate any received data by use of the primary radar. Because the content of ADS-B messages is not encrypted, it may be read by anybody.

Theory of operation

The ADS-B system has three main components: 1) ground infrastructure, 2) airborne component, and 3) operating procedures.

 A transmitting subsystem that includes message generation and transmission functions at the source; e.g., aircraft.
 The transport protocol; e.g., VHF (VDL mode 2 or 4), 1090ES, or 978 MHz UAT.
 A receiving subsystem that includes message reception and report assembly functions at the receiving destination; e.g., other aircraft, vehicle or ground system.

The source of the state vector and other transmitted information as well as user applications are not considered to be part of the ADS-B system.

Physical layer
Two link solutions are used as the physical layer for relaying ADS-B position reports: universal access transceiver, and 1090 MHz extended squitter.

Universal Access Transceiver (UAT)
A universal access transceiver is a data link intended to serve the majority of the general aviation community. The data link is approved in the Federal Aviation Administration's "final rule" for use in all airspace except class A (above 18,000 ft. MSL). UAT is intended to support not only ADS-B, but also flight information service – broadcast (FIS-B), traffic information service – broadcast (TIS-B), and, if required in the future, supplementary ranging and positioning capabilities. Due to the set of standards required for this rule, it is seen as the most effective application for general aviation users. UAT will allow aircraft equipped with "out" broadcast capabilities to be seen by any other aircraft using ADS-B In technology as well as by FAA ground stations. Aircraft equipped with ADS-B In technology will be able to see detailed altitude and vector information from other ADS-B Out equipped aircraft as well as FIS-B and TIS-B broadcasts. The FIS-B broadcast will allow receiving aircraft to view weather and flight service information including AIRMETs, SIGMETs, METARs, SPECI, national NEXRAD, regional NEXRAD, D-NOTAMs, FDC-NOTAMs, PIREPs, special use airspace status, terminal area forecasts, amended terminal aerodrome forecasts (TAFs), and winds and temperatures aloft forecasts. These broadcasts serve to provide early adopters of the technology with benefits as an incentive for more pilots to use the technology before 2020. Aircraft receiving traffic information through the TIS-B service will see other aircraft in a manner that is similar to how all aircraft will be seen after they have equipped by 2020. The availability of a non-subscription weather information service, FIS-B, provides general aviation users with a useful alternative to other monthly or annual fee-based services.

The UAT system is specifically designed for ADS-B operation. UAT is also the first link to be certified for "radar-like" ATC services in the United States. Since 2001 it has been providing  en-route separation (the same as mosaic radar but not  of single-site sensors) in Alaska. UAT is the only ADS-B link standard that is truly bidirectional: UAT users have access to ground-based aeronautical data (FIS-B) and can receive reports from proximate traffic (TIS-B) through a multilink gateway service that provides ADS-B reports for 1090ES-equipped aircraft and non-ADS-B equipped radar traffic. UAT equipped aircraft can also observe each other directly with high accuracy and minimal latency. Viable ADS-B UAT networks are being installed as part of the United States' NextGen air traffic system.

1090 MHz extended squitter

In 2002 the Federal Aviation Administration (FAA) announced a dual link decision using the 1090 MHz extended squitter (1090 ES) link for air carrier and private or commercial operators of high-performance aircraft, and universal access transceiver link for the typical general aviation user. In November 2012, the European Aviation Safety Agency confirmed that the European Union would also use 1090 ES for interoperability. The format of extended squitter messages has been codified by the ICAO.

With 1090 ES, the existing Mode S transponder (TSO C-112 or a standalone 1090 MHz transmitter) supports a message type known as the extended squitter message. It is a periodic message that provides position, velocity, time, and, in the future, intent. The basic ES does not offer intent since current flight management systems do not provide such data (called trajectory change points). To enable an aircraft to send an extended squitter message, the transponder is modified (TSO C-166A) and aircraft position and other status information is routed to the transponder. ATC ground stations and aircraft equipped with traffic collision avoidance system (TCAS) already have the necessary 1090 MHz (Mode S) receivers to receive these signals, and would only require enhancements to accept and process the additional extended squitter information. As per the FAA ADS-B link decision, and the technical link standards, 1090 ES does not support FIS-B service.

Relationship to surveillance radar
Radar directly measures the range and bearing of an aircraft from a ground-based antenna. The primary surveillance radar is usually a pulse radar. It continuously transmits high power radio frequency (RF) pulses. Bearing is measured by the position of the rotating radar antenna when it receives the RF pulses that are reflected from the aircraft skin. Range is measured by measuring the time it takes for the RF energy to travel to and from the aircraft.

Primary surveillance radar does not require any cooperation from the aircraft. It is robust in the sense that surveillance outage failure modes are limited to those associated with the ground radar system. Secondary surveillance radar depends on active replies from the aircraft. Its failure modes include the transponder aboard the aircraft. Typical ADS-B aircraft installations use the output of the navigation unit for navigation and for cooperative surveillance, introducing a common failure mode that must be accommodated in air traffic surveillance systems.

The radiated beam becomes wider as the distance between the antenna and aircraft becomes greater, making the position information less accurate. Additionally, detecting changes in aircraft velocity requires several radar sweeps that are spaced several seconds apart. In contrast, a system using ADS-B creates and listens for periodic position and intent reports from aircraft. These reports are generated based on the aircraft's navigation system, and distributed via one or more of the ADS-B data links. The accuracy of the data is no longer susceptible to the position of the aircraft or the length of time between radar sweeps. (However, the signal strength of the signal received from the aircraft at the ground station is still dependent on the range from the aircraft to the receiver, and interference, obstacles, or weather could degrade the integrity of the received signal enough to prevent the digital data from being decoded without errors. When the aircraft is farther away, the weaker received signal will tend to be more affected by the aforementioned adverse factors and is less likely to be received without errors. Error detection will allow errors to be recognized, so the system maintains full accuracy regardless of aircraft position when the signal can be received and decoded correctly. This advantage does not equate to total indifference to the range of an aircraft from the ground station.)

Today's air traffic control (ATC) systems do not rely on coverage by a single radar. Instead a multiradar picture is presented via the ATC system's display to the controller. This improves the quality of the reported position of the aircraft, provides a measure of redundancy, and makes it possible to verify the output of the different radars against others. This verification can also use sensor data from other technologies, such as ADS-B and multilateration.

Relationship to ADS-A/ADS-C
There are two commonly recognized types of ADS for aircraft applications:
 ADS-addressed (ADS-A), also known as ADS-Contract (ADS-C)
 ADS-broadcast (ADS-B)

ADS-A is based on a negotiated one-to-one peer relationship between an aircraft providing ADS information and a ground facility requiring receipt of ADS messages. For example, ADS-A reports are employed in the Future Air Navigation System (FANS) using the Aircraft Communications Addressing and Reporting System (ACARS) as the communication protocol. During flight over areas without radar coverage, e.g., oceanic and polar, reports are periodically sent by an aircraft to the controlling air traffic region.

Traffic information service – broadcast (TIS–B)

Traffic information service – broadcast (TIS–B) supplements ADS-B's air-to-air services to provide complete situational awareness in the cockpit of all traffic known to the ATC system. TIS–B is an important service for an ADS-B link in airspace where not all aircraft are transmitting ADS-B information. The ground TIS–B station transmits surveillance target information on the ADS-B data link for unequipped targets or targets transmitting only on another ADS-B link.

TIS–B uplinks are derived from the best available ground surveillance sources:
 ground radars for primary and secondary targets
 multilateration systems for targets on the airport surface
 ADS-B systems for targets equipped with a different ADS-B link

Multilink gateway service
The multilink gateway service is a companion to TIS-B for achieving interoperability between different aircraft equipped with 1090ES or UAT by using ground-based relay stations. These aircraft cannot directly share air-to-air ADS-B data due to the different communication frequencies. In terminal areas, where both types of ADS-B link are in use, ADS-B/TIS-B ground stations use ground-to-air broadcasts to relay ADS-B reports received on one link to aircraft using the other link.

Although multilink "solves" the issue of heavy airliners working on one frequency vs. light aircraft, the dual frequency nature of the system has several potential issues:

 Since two aircraft on two different ADS-B frequencies must use a ground station to talk to each other, this introduces the ground station as a point of failure, although to be fair, the 1090 signal is dependent secondary radar scans in any case (and thus cannot operate without a ground station).
 The time taken to traverse the full path from one aircraft, to the ground station, then to the second aircraft adds delay to the signal. This contrasts with two autonomous ADS-B transceivers on UAT, which have a shorter and shorter delay as they converge.
 Aircraft are frequently out of the range of ground based radar due to altitude. Radar can be blocked by mountains, and typically is not useful for coverage near an airport unless that airport has radar. Thus, approach, departure, and especially taxi/ground based operations are compromised (a major selling point of the system).

Because of the issues with multilink, many ADS-B manufacturers are designing ADS-B systems as dual-frequency capable.

Flight information services-broadcast (FIS-B) 
FIS-B provides weather text, weather graphics, NOTAMs, ATIS, and similar information. FIS-B is inherently different from ADS-B in that it requires sources of data external to the aircraft or broadcasting unit, and has different performance requirements such as periodicity of broadcast.

In the United States, FIS-B services are provided over the UAT link in areas that have a ground surveillance infrastructure.

Another potential aircraft-based broadcast capability is to transmit aircraft measurements of meteorological data.

Implementations by country

Australia 
Australia has full continental ADS-B coverage above FL300 (30,000 feet). ADS-B equipment is mandatory for all aircraft flying at this altitude. To achieve this level of coverage Airservices Australia operates more than 70 ADS-B ground receiver sites. In Australia the aviation regulator, the Civil Aviation Safety Authority, mandated a phased requirement for all Instrument Flight Rules (IFR) aircraft to be equipped with ADS-B Out by 2 February 2017. This applies to all Australian aircraft.

Canada 
Nav Canada commissioned operational use of ADS-B in 2009 and is now using it to provide coverage of its northern airspace around Hudson Bay, most of which currently has no radar coverage. The service was then extended to cover some oceanic areas off the east coast of Canada including the Labrador Sea, Davis Strait, Baffin Bay, and part of the North Atlantic Tracks around southern Greenland. The service is expected to be later extended to cover the rest of the Canadian Arctic, and to the rest of Canada.

In 2018, Nav Canada issued an aeronautical study proposing a mandate for Aireon-compatible ADS-B Out for all aircraft in Class A Airspace by 2021 and Class B Airspace by 2022, requiring a transponder capable of delivering antenna diversity performance.  In response to stakeholder feedback, Nav Canada later announced that such equipment will not be mandated according to that timeline, but rather that suitably equipped aircraft would be handled on a priority basis.  The dates upon which equipment will be required for operation in Canadian airspace have been announced as August 10, 2023 for Class A Airspace, May 16 2024 for Class B Airspace and Class C,D and E no sooner than 2026.

In May 2021, the not-for-profit Canadian In-Flight Information Broadcasting Association announced its intention to build and operate a network broadcasting FIS-B (weather) and TIS-B (traffic) information on 978 MHz. By spring 2022, five ground stations were operating in Ontario, with several more stations planned for Alberta and Saskatchewan. The Canadian network is fully compatible with the United States network. Aircraft can use the same ADS-B In receivers in both countries and the provided services operate seamlessly when crossing the border. CIFIB plans to have about 100 stations operating within a few years. Coverage in Canada will not be coast-to-coast, but will focus on areas with higher traffic.

China 
An American company ADS-B Technologies created one of the largest and most successful ADS-B systems in the world (an eight-station, 350+ aircraft network that spans more than 1,200 nmi across Central China). This was also the first UAT installation outside the United States. As of March 2009, more than 1.2 million incident/failure free flight hours have been flown with these ADS-B systems.

Iceland 
As of 2010, Isavia is in the process of installing ADS-B across the North Atlantic Ocean. The system is made up by 18 ADS-B receiver stations in Iceland, Faroe Islands, and Greenland.

India 
The Airports Authority of India (AAI), which manages the country's airspace, first commissioned German company Comsoft to install ADS-B ground stations at 14 airport sites nationwide in 2012. Comsoft finished installing seven new ADS-B ground stations under a second phase of deployment which India subsequently integrated into its ATC system in 2014, thus completing its ground network for automatic dependent surveillance-broadcast (ADS-B) tracking of aircraft.

In line with the International Civil Aviation Organization's aviation system block upgrade plan, AAI has said that its ADS-B network will provide redundant, satellite-based surveillance where radar coverage exists, fill gaps in surveillance where radar coverage is not possible due to high terrain or remote airspace and enable it to share ADS-B data with neighboring countries. The network covers the Indian subcontinent, plus parts of the Bay of Bengal and the Arabian Sea.

Sweden 
LFV Group in Sweden has implemented a nationwide ADS-B network with 12 ground stations. Installation commenced during spring 2006, and the network was fully (technically) operational in 2007. An ADS-B–supported system is planned for operational usage in Kiruna, Sweden, during spring 2009. Based on the VDL Mode 4 standards, the network of ground stations can support services for ADS-B, TIS-B, FIS-B, GNS-B (DGNSS augmentation) and point-to-point communication, allowing aircraft equipped with VDL 4-compliant transceivers to lower fuel consumption and reduce flight times.

United Arab Emirates 
United Arab Emirates commissioned three operational redundant ADS-B ground stations in early 2009 and is now using ADS-B to provide enhanced coverage of its upper airspace in combination and integrated with conventional surveillance radars.

United States 

To reduce congestion and cope with growing aircraft traffic, the Federal Aviation Administration has been developing the Next-Generation Air Transportation System (NextGen),  including ADS-B. ADS-B equipment is built to meet one of two sets of industry standards, DO-260B and DO-282B.

Aircraft operating in the United States in the airspace classes listed below are required to carry equipment that produces an ADS-B Out broadcast. ADS-B Out broadcasts information about an aircraft through an onboard transmitter to a ground receiver, moving air traffic control from a radar-based system to a satellite-derived aircraft location system.

There is no such mandate for ADS-B In, which receives data and provides it to in-cockpit displays. The FAA airspace requirements intentionally exclude some airspace that is frequently used by general aviation.

Operators can choose the 1090 megahertz extended squitter broadcast link, or the universal access transceiver broadcast link. FAA did not adopt higher performance standards that would enable all of the initial ADS-B In applications, but these can optionally be adopted.

Equipping aircraft
Fleet: 250,000 GA aircraft that will need ADS-B by 2020 of which 165,000 aircraft subject to ADS-B Out (Class I and Class II aircraft that generally fly below 18 000 feet). FAA forecasts an increase in the GA fleet from 224,172 aircraft in 2010 to 270,920 aircraft in 2031, growing an average of 0.9% per year.

Funding resources
Recent (April 2011) US federal legislation via House Bill for FAA re-authorization permits an "equipping fund" that includes a portion for some general aviation aircraft. The fund would provide financing at competitive rates backed by loan guarantees. A public-private partnership has been formed as the NextGen Equipage Fund, LLC which is managed by NEXA Capital Partners, LLC.

US implementation timetable

The Federal Aviation Administration ADS-B implementation is broken into three segments each with a corresponding time line. Ground segment implementation and deployment is expected to begin in 2009 and be completed by 2013 throughout the National Airspace System (NAS). Airborne equipment is user-driven and is expected to be completed both voluntarily based on perceived benefits and through regulatory actions (Rulemaking) by the FAA. The cost to equip with ADS-B Out capability is relatively small and would benefit the airspace with surveillance in areas not currently served by radar. The FAA intends to provide similar service within the NAS to what radar is currently providing (5 nmi en route and 3 nmi terminal radar standards) as a first step to implementation. However, ADS-B In capability is viewed as the most likely way to improve NAS throughput and enhance capacity.

In December 2008, Acting FAA Administrator Robert A. Sturgell gave the go-ahead for ADS-B to go live in southern Florida. The south Florida installation, which consists of 11 ground stations and supporting equipment, is the first commissioned in the United States, although developmental systems have been online in Alaska, Arizona, and along the East Coast since 2004. The completed system will consist of 794 ground station transceivers. The December 2008 action is in compliance with a late-term executive order from George W. Bush which mandated accelerated approval of NextGen.

FAA segment 1 (2006–09)
ADS-B deployment and voluntary equipment, along with rule-making activities. Pockets of development will exploit equipment deployment in the areas that will provide proof of concept for integration to ATC automation systems deployed in the NAS. It is being developed at the FAA's William J. Hughes Technical Center near Egg Harbor City, New Jersey.

FAA segment 2 (2010–14)
ADS-B ground stations will be deployed throughout the NAS, with an in-service decision due in the 2012–2013 time frame. Completed deployment will occur in 2013–14. Equipment rules have been finalized and the current standards are DO-282B for UAT and DO-260B for 1090ES:
 Airport situational awareness — a combination of detailed airport maps, airport multilateration systems, ADS-B systems and enhanced aircraft displays have the potential to significantly improve Airport Surface Situational Awareness (ASSA), and Final Approach and Runway Occupancy Awareness (FAROA).
 Oceanic In-trail — ADS-B may provide enhanced situational awareness and safety for Oceanic In-trail maneuvers as additional aircraft become equipped.
 Gulf of Mexico — in the Gulf of Mexico, where ATC radar coverage is incomplete, the FAA is locating ADS-B (1090 MHz) receivers on oil rigs to relay information received from aircraft equipped with ADS-B extended squitters back to the Houston Center to expand and improve surveillance coverage.
 Terminal Airspace — ADS-B is currently in service for two terminal airspace areas, Louisville, Kentucky, and Philadelphia, Pennsylvania.

FAA segment 3 (2015–20)
ADS-B In equipment will be based on user perceived benefit, but is expected to be providing increased situational awareness and efficiency benefits within this segment. Those aircraft who choose to equip in advance of any mandate will see benefits associated with preferential routes and specific applications. Limited radar decommissioning will begin in the time frame with an ultimate goal of a 50% reduction in the secondary surveillance radar infrastructure.

On 27 May 2010, the FAA published its final rule mandating that by 2020 all aircraft owners will be required to have ADS-B Out capabilities when operating in any airspace that currently requires a transponder (airspace classes A, B, and C, and airspace class E at certain altitudes).

On 14 June 2012, FreeFlight Systems and Chevron received STC for first rule-compliant ADS-B installation in GOMEX helicopters that was awarded by the FAA.

Early adopters
 Cargo Airline Association Cargo carriers, notably UPS. They operate at their hub airports largely at night. Much of the benefit to these carriers is envisioned through merging and spacing the arriving and departing traffic to a more manageable flow. More environmentally friendly and efficient area navigation (RNAV) descent profiles, combined with CDTI, may allow crews to eventually aid controllers with assisted visual acquisition of traffic and limited cockpit-based separation of aircraft. The benefits to the carrier are fuel and time efficiencies associated with idle descent and shorter traffic patterns than typical radar vectoring allows.
 Embry-Riddle Aeronautical University ERAU has equipped their training aircraft at its two main campuses in Florida and Arizona with UAT ADS-B capability as a situational safety enhancement. The University has been doing this since May 2003, making it the first use in general aviation. With the addition of the Garmin G1000 flight instrument system to their fleet in 2006, ERAU became the first fleet to combine a glass cockpit with ADS-B.
 University of North Dakota UND has received an FAA grant to test ADS-B, and has begun to outfit their Piper Warrior fleet with an ADS-B package.

Privacy 
The FAA in America has come up with two system to address privacy concerns

 Limiting Aircraft Data Displayed (LADD): Aircraft owners or designated representatives may request limiting aircraft data displayed (formally referred to as blocking) or unblocking of flight tracking data. Flight tracking services that draw the data from FAA agree to block the information, though as noted elsewhere in this article, the data are unencrypted and may be available from non-FAA sources.
 Privacy ICAO Aircraft (PIA): Program to improve the privacy of eligible aircraft by enabling aircraft owners to request an alternate, temporary ICAO aircraft address, which will not be assigned to the owner in the Civil Aviation Registry (CAR).

System design considerations
A concern for any ADS-B protocol is the capacity for carrying ADS-B messages from aircraft, as well as allowing the radio channel to continue to support any legacy services. For 1090 ES, each ADS-B message is composed of a pair of data packets. The greater the number of packets transmitted from one aircraft, the fewer aircraft that can participate in the system, due to the fixed and limited channel data bandwidth.

System capacity is defined by establishing a criterion for what the worst environment is likely to be, then making that a minimum requirement for system capacity. For 1090 ES, both TCAS and ATCRBS/MSSR are existing users of the channel. 1090 ES ADS-B must not reduce capacity of these existing systems.

The FAA national program office and other international aviation regulators are addressing concerns about ADS-B non-secure nature of ADS-B transmissions. ADS-B messages can be used to know the location of an aircraft, and there is no means to guarantee that this information is not used inappropriately. Additionally, there are some concerns about the integrity of ADS-B transmissions. ADS-B messages can be produced, with simple, low-cost measures, which spoof the locations of multiple phantom aircraft to disrupt safe air travel. There is no foolproof means to guarantee integrity, but there are means to monitor for this type of activity. This problem is however similar to the usage of ATCRBS/MSSR where false signals also are potentially dangerous (uncorrelated secondary tracks).

There are some concerns about ADS-B dependence on satellite navigation systems to generate state vector information, although the risks can be mitigated by using redundant sources of state vector information; e.g., GPS, GLONASS, Galileo or multilateration.

There are some general aviation concerns that ADS-B removes anonymity of the VFR aircraft operations. The ICAO 24-bit transponder code specifically assigned to each aircraft will allow monitoring of that aircraft when within the service volumes of the Mode-S/ADS-B system. Unlike the Mode A/C transponders, there is no code "1200"/"7000", which offers casual anonymity. Mode-S/ADS-B identifies the aircraft uniquely among all in the world, in a similar fashion as a MAC number for an Ethernet card or the International Mobile Equipment Identity (IMEI) of a GSM phone. However, the FAA is allowing UAT-equipped aircraft to utilize a random self-assigned temporary ICAO address in conjunction with the use of beacon code 1200. 1090 ES equipped aircraft using ADS-B will not have this option.

In order for the ADS-B system to function to the fullest extent, equipage into all aircraft in the airspace is required. This demands the transponder technology be scalable from the smallest aircraft to the largest aircraft to allow for 100% equipage for any given airspace. Current transponder technology is capable of equipping the larger, traditional aircraft but a new type of transponder is required for equipping into aircraft that are smaller and lighter or don't have electrical systems like the large traditionally transponder equipped aircraft. The requirements for these smaller and lighter aircraft are mainly size, weight, and power (SWAP) and transponder technology must allow for equipage of these types of aircraft to enable saturation of ADS-B for total visibility in any given airspace.

On 7 June 2002 the FAA published a historical overview of its decision on the ADS-B link architecture for use in the National Airspace System (NAS).

Technical and regulatory documents
 Minimum Aviation System Performance Standards (MASPS)
 Minimum Operational Performance Standards (MOPS)
 DO-242A — ADS-B MASPS. Describes system-wide operational use of ADS-B.

Satellite (space based) ADS-B Collection
A significant step forward for ADS-B is the reception by artificial satellites of the ADS-B signal. It was tested for the first time in 2013 on ESA's PROBA-V and it is being deployed by companies like Spire Global using low-cost nanosatellites. Aireon is also working on space-based ADS-B with the Iridium satellite network, a LEO (Low Earth Orbit) satellite network that was originally created to deliver phone and data service anywhere on the planet. By capturing ADS-B position data from aircraft flying below the satellite, the network will give the following capabilities:

 Air traffic control using surveillance based separation standards will be possible over water, in areas that radar does not currently cover. Currently, air traffic control uses the larger procedural separation standard in oceanic and remote areas.
 As is currently possible in radar covered areas, a position history will be available for lost aircraft, as in the case of Malaysia Airlines Flight 370.

The system only receives ADS-B on aircraft broadcasting on the 1090 MHz frequency. This limits the system generally to airliners and business aircraft, despite the fact that small aircraft are frequently off radar due to mountains blocking the signal at low altitudes. The system could be compromised by smaller, private aircraft with exclusively belly mounted ADS-B antennas, due to the aircraft hull blocking the signal.

The rationale for using the Iridium satellite network for this new capability was due to:
 The Iridium satellites fly very low, and thus can receive the ADS-B out signals more reliably (transponders and ADS-B were designed for ground reception).
 Iridium satellites are replaced relatively frequently due to the increased air friction at their lower altitude, and thus lower lifespan. Thus the system would be deployed on iridium faster.
 Iridium provides worldwide coverage, including the poles.

In September 2016, Aireon and FlightAware announced a partnership to provide this global space-based ADS-B data to airlines for flight tracking of their fleets and, in response to Malaysia Airlines Flight 370, for compliance with the ICAO Global Aeronautical Distress and Safety System (GADSS) requirement for airlines to track their fleets. In December 2016, Flightradar24 entered an agreement with Gomspace for space-based tracking in 2016.

SpaceX subsequently placed 66 operational and 9 spare Iridium satellites in orbit over the course of 8 launches between 14 January 2017 and 11 January 2019. Another 6 spare satellites remain on the ground.

The ICAO describes space-based ADS-B as a technology equalizer, offering developing nations an airspace surveillance capability.
By 2020, 34 nations will deploy the system, including the 17 members of the Asecna in Africa, and the Cocesna air navigation services agency in Central America.

See also
 Acronyms and abbreviations in avionics
 ASDE-X
 Automatic Identification System, a conceptually similar system for marine vessels
 Advanced Train Control System, a conceptually similar system for railroads
 Automatic Packet Reporting System (APRS), a conceptually similar GPS-based tracking system in the amateur radio service
 DO-212, minimal operational performance standards for airborne automatic surveillance (ADS)
 Eurocat (air traffic control)
 FLARM
 Flight tracking
 Free flight (air traffic control)
 GPS aircraft tracking
 Portable collision avoidance system
 Traffic collision avoidance system

References

Further reading

External links
  
 
 
 
 
 ADS-B Monitor - a free tool to decode, display and log ADS-B messages

Avionics
Air traffic control